Junky Star is the third studio album by Ryan Bingham released in 2010 through Lost Highway Records.

Track listing
"The Poet" – 4:56
"The Wandering" – 3:08
"Strange Feelin' In The Air" - 4:46
"Junky Star" – 4:49
"Depression" – 4:53
"Hallelujah" - 5:00
"Yesterday's Blues" - 4:14
"Direction Of The Wind" - 4:29
"Lay My Head On The Rail" - 2:59
"Hard Worn Trail" - 3:55
"Self-Righteous Wall" - 5:17
"All Choked Up Again" - 6:11
"The Weary Kind (bonus track on editions)" - 4:19

Chart performance

References

Ryan Bingham albums
2010 albums
Lost Highway Records albums